The  is a compact car (C-segment in Europe) manufactured by the Japanese automaker Daihatsu from 1989 to 2000. It is most notable for its unusual body style, which, despite appearing to be a 4-door notchback sedan, is in fact a 5-door liftback with a notchback-shaped 412-litre trunk and a tailgate.

History 

As Daihatsu firmly established itself as Toyota's compact car specialist brand, compact cars were the biggest vehicles marketed by the company. When replacing the long-running Charmant, the company decided to try a unique approach at the segment, with the intention to capitalize on the preferences for sedans, while at the same time offering the flexibility and convenience of a 5-door hatchback body. Resulting from such thinking, the Applause was presented at the 1989 Geneva Motor Show in production-ready "concept" form, as the MS-X90. The engine was also a new development, a 16-valve 1.6-liter inline-four shared with the F300-series Rocky/Feroza/Sportrak. Daihatsu took the opportunity to introduce a platform that wasn't shared with an existing Toyota platform that the previous Charmont used when the Toyota Corolla was changed to front wheel drive with the Toyota Corolla (E80) in 1983.

In the first year in the market, Applause's reputation was tarnished by widely publicized incidents of gasoline spurting under excessive air pressure while refuelling, which could lead to very hazardous accidents. Daihatsu fixed the problem in the 1990 model, named Applause Theta, to highlight the improvement. The car was engineered from the beginning to be equipped with four-wheel-drive, a model which appeared only a few months after the introduction. It came equipped with a viscous coupling, sending up to 47 percent of the power to the rear wheels. In the spring of 1991 Daihatsu presented a cabrio coach prototype of the Applause, called the "Applause Windward," but it never entered production.

1992 facelift 

In 1992, the Applause was mildly facelifted, with a subtle alteration of the front and rear fascias and slight increase in length. The "Theta" designation was dropped. The carburetor engine was not available anymore, replaced by a down-tuned version of the fuel injected engine which qualified for a lower insurance category in many European markets. The 1994 model year saw the cancellation of the AWD version, with a rear fascia upgrade and slight grille alteration given to the rest of the range.

1997 facelift 

Although the Daihatsu Applause can be said to have looked very modern and be at least on par with competition in terms of size back in 1989, after seven years in the market it began to appear quite dated and smaller than newer compact cars. Daihatsu found it economically unjustifiable to replace the car with an all-new model, but rather gave the car an extensive facelift in hope of reviving weakening sales.

The refreshed Applause debuted at the 57th Frankfurt Motor Show in September 1997. Totally new front and rear fascias provided for a much more "formal" appearance, along with a small increase in length. However, the car remained the same with regard to all other measurements, including cargo capacity.

The facelift did not help sales result much, so the model was discontinued altogether in May 2000, without a direct replacement for export markets. In Japan, the Daihatsu Altis, which was in essence a rebadged Toyota Camry, took over its role as Daihatsu's largest sedan.

Drivetrain 
The Applause was a FF layout car with transversely-mounted engine. A full-time AWD version was sold from late 1989 to 1994.

Engine 
All models were powered by various versions of the Daihatsu HD 1589 cc straight-four 16-valve SOHC engine.

 HD-F carburetor,  - 1989–1992 (Europe market)
 HD-F carburetor,  - 1989–1992 (domestic market)
 HD-E EFI, 105 PS (77 kW),  of torque - 1989–1997 (export markets, FWD or AWD)
 HD-E EFI, 120 PS (89 kW),  of torque - 1989–2000 (domestic market, compression ratio increased in 1997)
 HD-E EFI, 90 PS (66 kW),  of torque - 1992–1997 (export markets)
 HD-E EFI, 99 PS (73 kW),  of torque - 1997–2000 (export markets - replaced both former engines, increased compression ratio)

Transmissions 
 5-speed manual (not available with  after 1997)
 3-speed automatic ( engine, FWD setup)
 4-speed automatic (engine, FWD setup)

References 

Applause
Cars introduced in 1989
1990s cars
2000s cars
Compact cars
Hatchbacks
Sedans
Front-wheel-drive vehicles
All-wheel-drive vehicles
Cars discontinued in 2000